Coraopolis Armory is an armory located at 835 5th Avenue in Coraopolis, Pennsylvania.  It was built in 1938, and was added to the National Register of Historic Places on November 14, 1991

It houses the Headquarters Company, 28th Signal Battalion, Pennsylvania National Guard Army Reserve.

References

Armories on the National Register of Historic Places in Pennsylvania
Pennsylvania National Guard
Buildings and structures in Allegheny County, Pennsylvania
Infrastructure completed in 1938
Moderne architecture in Pennsylvania
National Register of Historic Places in Allegheny County, Pennsylvania